Taylor Evans Stubblefield (born January 21, 1982) is an American football coach and former player. He was most recently the wide receiver coach for the Penn State Nittany Lions.  He is a former wide receiver for the Carolina Panthers and St. Louis Rams of the National Football League (NFL).  He left Purdue owning the most receptions in NCAA history.  Stubblefield was most recently the wide receivers coach with the Toronto Argonauts. A three-sport athlete at A.C. Davis High School, Stubblefield committed to the Purdue University to play football for the Boilermakers. In his collegiate debut in 2001, he had five receptions for 65 yards. He led the team in receptions and was named to the All-Freshman Big Ten team by Sporting News. During his sophomore season, he finished with 77 receptions for 789 yards, but didn't record a touchdown catch. As a junior in 2003, Stubblefield earned second-team All-Big Ten honors at the conclusion of the season. In the 2001 Sun Bowl, he had nine catches for a Sun Bowl-record 196 yards. During the 2004 season, Stubblefield was a Biletnikoff Award finalist, earned first-team All-Big Ten honors and was named a Consensus All-American. He finished his college career with an NCAA record of 325 receptions which he held for seven years, 3,629 yards, and 27 touchdowns. He was named to the Purdue Athletic Hall of fame in 2015 and was also named to the 75th Anniversary Sunbowl Team.

Despite his college success, Stubblefield was not selected in 2005 NFL Draft. He signed as an undrafted free agent with the Carolina Panthers and then signed with the Hamilton Tiger-cats of the Canadian Football League. During the 2006 season he was signed by the St. Louis Rams and later was re-signed by the Tiger-cats.

When the 2007 season came around, Stubblefield hung up his cleats and returned to his home state of Washington, where he was named the wide receivers coach for Central Washington University. The following season, he took the same position with Eastern Michigan, while also working towards his master's degree. For the 2009 and 2010 seasons, he was asked by former Purdue Defense Coordinator Brock Spack to take the wide receivers coaching position at Illinois State. For the Redbirds, Stubblefield coached Eyad Salem, who broke the school's single-season receptions record (92 catches) and twice tied the single-game receptions record with back-to-back 14-catch efforts. Salem was an All-MVFC first-team selection. The next year, he took a job with Central Michigan as their wide receivers coach. After stops at New Mexico and Wake Forest, Stubblefield was hired with a two-year contract at Utah. Utah recorded 9-4, and 10-3 seasons and attended the Las Vegas Bowl both years. Stubblefield's contract was not extended after his original deal and he moved on to coach with the Toronto Argonauts of the CFL for one season before joining Troy Calhoun's staff at the United States Air Force Academy in February 2017.

Early years
Stubblefield was born in Yakima, Washington.  He graduated from A. C. Davis High School in Yakima, where he was a member of the football, basketball and track and field teams. For football, he set school records with 123 receptions, 1,900 receiving yards and 21 touchdowns. He also had the school record for receiving yards and receiving touchdowns in a single game, which was broken by Cooper Kupp in 2011.  He was named First Team All-State. He also led the basketball team to the state tournament three times, earning fifth and eighth-place trophies.

College career
Stubblefield attended Purdue University, located in West Lafayette, Indiana, where he played under head coach Joe Tiller. He played alongside future NFL player Kyle Orton and consensus All-American kicker-punter Travis Dorsch. As a redshirt freshman he led the Boilermakers with 73 receptions. In the 2001 Sun Bowl against Washington State, he tied a Sun Bowl record of nine receptions, and set a record with 196 receiving yards.  He also scored two touchdowns and recorded a bowl record with a 244 all-purpose yards.  He helped lead the Boilermakers to a second straight Sun Bowl appearance in 2002.  As a junior in 2003, Stubblefield led the Big Ten Conference with 86 receptions.  He totaled 835 yards and three touchdowns.  He was a second-team All-Big Ten selection.

Stubblefield was named a First Team All-Big Ten selection his senior year (2004), in which he caught 89 passes with 1,095 yards receiving and scored 16 touchdowns, third-most in the nation. He became the first player to lead the conference in receptions two seasons in a row since Ohio State's David Boston in 1998.  The All-American participated in the East-West Shrine All-Star Game, where he had seven receptions for 128 yards and scored two touchdowns, while throwing a pass that led to the first touchdown. He became the first consensus All-American receiver for Purdue since Bernie Flowers in 1952 and earned First Team-All Big Ten honors.

With career totals of 3,629 yards and 21 touchdowns, Stubblefield ranked as the all-time NCAA receptions leader with 325 in his college career (until it was broken by Ryan Broyles of the University of Oklahoma on October 15, 2011). His teammate, John Standeford, had set the Big Ten Conference record with 266 receptions in 2003. Stubblefield was named to the Sun Bowl's 75th anniversary team.

Statistics
Source:

Numbers in bold are Purdue school records

Professional career

Carolina Panthers
Stubblefield went undrafted by the NFL after his successful college career. He was signed as a free agent by the Carolina Panthers on April 26, 2005.

Hamilton Tiger-cats
He played during the 2005 season with the Hamilton Tiger-cats in the Canadian Football League.

St. Louis Rams
On January 6, 2006, Stubblefield was signed to the St. Louis Rams.

Return to the Hamilton Tiger-cats
Stubblefield returned to the Tiger-cats on March 6, 2007.

Coaching career

Central Washington
After a brief stint playing at the professional level, Stubblefield returned to his home state of Washington, where he served as a wide receiver coach for the Wildcats at Central Washington University, an NCAA division II program.

Eastern Michigan
After just one season with Central Washington, Stubblefield joined the Eastern Michigan staff to become an assistant coach under head coach, Jeff Genyk.

Illinois State
After Genyk was replaced by Ron English, Stubblefield moved on to Illinois State to be an assistant and wide receiver coach. He joined head coach Brock Spack, who was a former defensive coordinator at Purdue.

Central Michigan
On February 18, 2011, Central Michigan announced the addition of Stubblefield as their wide receivers coach.

New Mexico
Stubblefield coached wide receivers for New Mexico in 2012.

Wake Forest
Stubblefield moved on to Wake Forest in 2013.

Utah
In February 2014, Stubblefield was named the wide receivers coach at Utah.

University of Miami
Taylor Stubblefield joined the University of Miami football program in January 2019, accepting the position of wide receivers coach.

Penn State
Taylor Stubblefield joined the Pennsylvania State University football program in January 2020, accepting the position of wide receivers coach.

In 2020, Jahan Dotson led the Big Ten in receiving with 884 yards. Dotson was also tied as the national leader for receptions of over 60 yards (4) and went on to earn honorable mention All-American. Stubblefield also coached Parker Washington to Freshman All American Honors by the athletic. Washington finished the season tied for second nationally among true freshman with 6 touchdown receptions. Following the completion of the 2020 season, Stubblefield was given the additional title of Offensive Recruiting Coordinator.   Dotson and Washington both had 820 yards or more receiving in 2021, with Dotson being selected 16th overall in the 2022 NFL Draft. Penn State parted ways with Stubblefield in January of 2023.

References

External links
 Central Michigan profile

1982 births
Living people
Air Force Falcons football coaches
All-American college football players
American football wide receivers
Canadian football wide receivers
Carolina Panthers players
Central Michigan Chippewas football coaches
Central Washington Wildcats football coaches
Eastern Michigan Eagles football coaches
Hamilton Tiger-Cats players
Illinois State Redbirds football coaches
Sportspeople from Yakima, Washington
Players of American football from Washington (state)
Purdue Boilermakers football players
St. Louis Rams players
Utah Utes football coaches
Wake Forest Demon Deacons football coaches
American players of Canadian football
Toronto Argonauts coaches
Miami Hurricanes football coaches